Armadillo World Headquarters, Austin, TX, 6/13/75 is an album by the country rock band the New Riders of the Purple Sage.  It was recorded live on June 13, 1975, at the Armadillo World Headquarters in Austin, Texas, and released on November 1, 2005.  It was the fourth complete New Riders concert that was recorded in the 1970s and released in the 2000s as an album on the Kufala Recordings label.

At the time of the concert at the Armadillo, Skip Battin was the New Riders' bass player.  Battin wrote or co-wrote three songs that appear on the album.  Previously a member of the Byrds, Battin had joined the New Riders in 1974 after Dave Torbert left to join Kingfish.  Also in the NRPS lineup for this recording were band co-founders John "Marmaduke" Dawson and David Nelson, and long-time members Buddy Cage and Spencer Dryden.

Recording and sound quality
According to a statement on the back cover, the CD "was mastered directly from the original quarter track analog reel to reel tape at 7.5 ips.  The few initial anomalies at the beginning of the show have been preserved for authenticity."

Track listing

Personnel

New Riders of the Purple Sage
John Dawson – guitar, vocals
David Nelson – guitar, vocals
Buddy Cage – pedal steel guitar
Spencer Dryden – drums
Skip Battin – bass, vocals

Production
Rob Bleetstein – producer
Stephen Barncard – mastering
Onion Audio – recording

Notes

New Riders of the Purple Sage live albums
2005 live albums